William Patrick Ashley (20 September 1881 – 27 June 1958) was an Australian  politician.

Ashley was born at Singorambah, near Hay, New South Wales and educated at Hay. He went to South Africa in May 1902, but saw no action in the Second Boer War and returned to Australia in August.  He established himself as a tobacconist in Lithgow and married Theresa Ellen Maloney in July 1921. He served as an alderman and mayor on Lithgow Council.

Political career
Ashley was pre-selected for the Australian Labor Party Senate ticket for the 1937 election, partly because his surname would appear high on the ballot paper under the alphabetical system then in effect. With the fall of the Fadden government, he became Postmaster-General and Minister for Information in the Curtin government. In March 1943, he lost the portfolio of information, but gained the position of Vice-President of the Executive Council. In February 1945, he became Minister for Supply and Shipping.

In a minor reshuffle in April 1948, Ashley became Minister for Shipping and Fuel, responsible for the Department of Shipping and Fuel. In June 1949, his handling of a scheme to introduce long-service leave for coal miners contributed to a major ensuing strike. He had implied that the federal government would contribute financially to the scheme, but this proved not to be the case. In addition, the proposed scheme might have limited the right to strike. He also attempted to support British economic recovery by buying oil from British companies—when they ran short of supplies, he was forced to impose petrol rationing. Both the coal miners' strike and the fuel rationing contributed to Labor's defeat at the 1949 election. He stayed in the Senate for the rest of his life and supported H. V. Evatt against the Industrial Groups.

Ashley died in Sydney Hospital on 27 June 1958, survived by his wife and daughter. He had suffered a stroke earlier in the month, while being driven to an appointment for his arthritis treatment. He was accorded a state funeral. Ashley died intestate.

Notes

External links

1881 births
1958 deaths
Members of the Cabinet of Australia
Australian Labor Party members of the Parliament of Australia
Members of the Australian Senate for New South Wales
Members of the Australian Senate
20th-century Australian politicians